Ma Xizhen (馬希珍,) was a Chinese Hui Muslim General, born in Bahuzhuang village (八戶庄村) in Guanghe County, Gansu province. He joined the Ninghai Army in Qinghai and became part of its Fifth Cavalry Army. He then became the commander of the third cavalry regiment of the first division. Ma fought against Soviet and Mongol forces in the Pei-ta-shan Incident. Under his command served the Salar Muslim General Han Youwen who led the First Cavalry Division.

References

Bibliography

External links 

Republic of China warlords from Gansu
Hui people
National Revolutionary Army generals from Gansu
Chinese Nationalist military figures
Kuomintang politicians in Taiwan
Chinese Muslim generals
20th century in Xinjiang

zh:馬希珍